Think of Me First as a Person is a documentary film and home movie about Dwight Core Jr., a boy with Down syndrome. The footage was originally shot throughout the 1960s and '70s by Core's father, Dwight Core Sr. The footage was later discovered and completed by the filmmaker's grandson, George Ingmire.

The film was first shown at New Orleans' 2006 Home Movie Day. Later that year, it was selected for preservation in the United States National Film Registry, an honor bestowed every year to twenty-five films deemed "culturally, historically, or aesthetically significant." The Library of Congress's statement announcing the 2006 additions to the Registry called the film a "loving portrait by a father of his son with Down syndrome" that represented "the creativity and craftsmanship of the American amateur filmmaker."

The film's title comes from the 1974 Rita Dranginis poem of the same name.

See also
 Lily: A Longitudinal View of Life with Down Syndrome

Notes

External links

Library of Congress press release
Editor and Director George Ingmire's website
Website for the film "Think of Me First as a Person"
Home Movie Day News blog entry on film.
Hollywood Reporter article that includes information about new non-Hollywood additions to the National Film Registry
Rita Dranginis, "Think Of Me First As A Person."

2006 films
United States National Film Registry films
Documentary films about children with disability
Documentary films about Down syndrome
2006 documentary films
American documentary films
2000s English-language films
2000s American films